The Sweden men's national under-18 basketball team is a national basketball team of Sweden, administered by the Svenska Basketbollförbundet. It represents the country in international men's under-18 basketball competitions.

FIBA U18 European Championship participations

See also
Sweden men's national basketball team
Sweden men's national under-16 basketball team
Sweden women's national under-19 basketball team

References

External links
Official website 
Archived records of Sweden team participations

U
Basketball
Men's national under-18 basketball teams